Southwest is an unincorporated community in Harrison Township, Elkhart County, Indiana.

History
A post office opened in Southwest in 1854, and remained in operation until it was discontinued in 1901. Southwest lies southwest of the county seat, hence the name.

In 1905, Southwest contained a general store, a brick schoolhouse, three churches, and a dozen families.

Geography

References

Unincorporated communities in Elkhart County, Indiana
Unincorporated communities in Indiana